Strophomenoidea is an extinct superfamily of prehistoric brachiopods in the order Strophomenida.

Families 
- after 

 Amphistrophiidae 
 Christianiidae 
 Douvillinidae 
 Eopholidostrophiidae 
 Glyptomenidae 
 Leptaenoideidae 
 Leptostrophiidae 
 Rafinesquinidae 
 Shaleriidae 
 Strophodontidae
 Strophomenidae 
 Strophonellidae

References

External links 
 

Prehistoric animal superfamilies
Strophomenida